Faustina Bordoni (30 March 1697 – 4 November 1781) was an Italian mezzo-soprano.

In Hamburg, Germany, the Johann Adolph Hasse Museum is dedicated to her husband and partly to Bordoni.

Early career
She was born in Venice and brought up under the protection of the aristocratic brother composers Alessandro and Benedetto Marcello. Her singing teacher was another composer, Michelangelo Gasparini. For many years in the service of the Elector Palatine, she made her operatic debut at Venice in 1716 in Carlo Francesco Pollarolo's Ariodante, singing in her home city until 1725 in operas by Albinoni, the Gasparini brothers, Giacomelli, Leonardo Leo, Giuseppe Maria Orlandini, the Pollarolos, father and son, and Leonardo Vinci, amongst others. In 1718 and 1719 in Venice she sang alongside Francesca Cuzzoni, later to become her great rival. During this period she also performed several times at Reggio nell'Emilia, Naples and Parma, and at least once in Milan, Modena and Florence. After her German début in 1723, singing in  Pietro Torri's Griselda at Munich, she was a great favourite north of the Alps during the 1720s, also enjoying great success in Vienna (1725–26). Her nickname was the "new siren", and she was commonly known simply as "Faustina".

"The Rival Queens"

Her London début, as Rossane in Handel's Alessandro, took place on 5 May 1726, alongside Senesino and Cuzzoni. During the next two seasons she created four more Handel roles: Alceste in Admeto and Pulcheria in Riccardo Primo (both 1727), and Emira in Siroe and Elisa in Tolomeo (1728). She also sang in a revival of Radamisto, and in operas by Ariosti and Giovanni Bononcini. In a performance of the latter's Astianatte on 6 June 1727, a riot broke out in the audience between her followers and those of her 'rival' Cuzzoni in the King's Theatre, Haymarket,  in front of Caroline, Princess of Wales. This furore seized the public imagination and a great deal of journalistic exaggeration  – the pamphleteer John Arbuthnot published "The DEVIL to pay at St. JAMES's: Or A full and true ACCOUNT of a most horrid and bloody BATTLE between Madam FAUSTINA and Madam CUZZONI", in which he lambasted the two ladies: "TWO of a Trade seldom or ever agree … But who would have thought the Infection should reach the Hay-market and inspire Two Singing Ladies to pull each other's Coiffs, to the no small Disquiet of the Directors, who (God help them) have enough to do to keep Peace and Quietness between them. … I shall not determine who is the Aggressor, but take the surer Side, and wisely pronounce them both in Fault; for it is certainly an apparent Shame that two such well bred Ladies should call Bitch and Whore, should scold and fight like any Billingsgates." Recent research has shown, however, that it was the singers' supporters who were behaving badly, rather than the singers themselves, who had worked together before in Italy and continued to work together for the Royal Academy until the directors were forced to dissolve it in 1728 owing to mounting debts.

Later career

Unlike Cuzzoni, Faustina never returned to England. During the years 1728–1732, she was again much in evidence on the stages of major Italian cities, especially Venice. In 1730, she married the German composer, Johann Adolf Hasse, and the following year the couple were summoned to the court of Augustus the Strong at Dresden, where Faustina enjoyed a great success in her husband's opera Cleofide. They were described by the famous librettist Metastasio as "truly an exquisite couple".

Hasse remained at the Saxon court for more than thirty years, and his wife sang in at least fifteen of the operas he composed between Caio Fabricio in 1734 and Ciro riconosciuto (1751). Faustina was, however, permitted to make many long trips to Italy, appearing again in Naples, Venice, Parma and elsewhere in operas by Pergolesi, Porpora and Vinci, alongside those of her husband. Though she retired from the theatre in 1751, Faustina kept her salary and title of virtuosa da camera to the Elector until the death of Augustus' successor, Frederick Augustus II in 1763.

At this point, she and her husband moved to Vienna, before removing finally to Venice in 1773. Mozart  gave her a visit in 1769. They  had two daughters, both trained singers. On a visit in 1772, Charles Burney described Faustina as "a short, brown, sensible, and lively old woman ... with good remains … of that beauty for which she was so much celebrated in her youth." Unlike her rival Cuzzoni, who died in poverty, Faustina had a happy and prosperous old age.

Bordoni as an artist

The composer Quantz gave a description of Bordoni's qualities, as given to Charles Burney:

Burney himself remarked on the strength of the note E (E5) in her voice, and it is worth noting that half of the arias written for her by Handel are in E or A (minor or major), keys which could give this note particular prominence.

References

Further reading
 J. Arbuthnot, The Miscellaneous Works of the Late Dr. Arbuthnot (London, 1751), pp 213–214
 C. Burney, The Present State of Music in Germany, the Netherlands and United Provinces (1773)
 C. Burney, A General History of Music (London, 1789), Vol. 4
 S. Ograjenšek, "Francesca Cuzzoni and Faustina Bordoni: the Rival Queens?" 'Handel and the Divas' exhibition catalogue, Handel House Museum, (London, 2008), pp 3–7
 F. Rogers, "Handel and Five Prima Donnas" in The Musical Quarterly, Vol. 29, No. 2 (April 1943), pp 214–224
 
 S. Ograjenšek, "Francesca Cuzzoni and Faustina Bordoni: the Rival Queens?" 'Handel and the Divas' exhibition catalogue, Handel House Museum, (London, 2008), pp 3–7
 Saskia Maria Woyke, Faustina Bordoni: Biographie – Vokalprofil – Rezeption, (Frankfurt 2009)

1697 births
1781 deaths
Musicians from Venice
Italian mezzo-sopranos
Operatic mezzo-sopranos
18th-century Italian actresses
Italian stage actresses
18th-century Italian women opera singers
Actors from Venice